Elena Gerhardt (11 November 1883 – 11 January 1961) was a German mezzo-soprano singer associated with the singing of German classical lieder, of which she was considered one of the great interpreters. She left Germany for good to live in London in October 1934.

Training, and first recitals with Nikisch 
Elena Gerhardt was born at Connewitz near Leipzig, the daughter of a Leipzig restaurateur.  She studied at the Leipzig Conservatory from 1899 to 1903, first with Professor Carl Rebling and then with Marie Hedmondt (d. 1941), who remained her friend and vocal adviser for many years. After a year of only technical study, she began work on operatic roles, such as Cherubino, Dorabella, the Mignon of Ambroise Thomas and Hermann Goetz's Katharina, interspersed with lieder. She won the Carl Reinecke Scholarship. Leipzig provided many opportunities to hear international artists and to hear the early masters.

In 1902, Arthur Nikisch became director of the Leipzig Conservatory, and approved her to sing publicly in Leipzig, which she first did in November 1902: he also gave her a solo in Franz Liszt's "Choruses from Herder's Entfesselter Prometheus" (S. 69). On graduating in 1903 and with many engagements, she mentioned her wish to give a lieder recital, and Nikisch offered to be her accompanist, their first (victorious) performance being at the Kaufhaus in Leipzig on her twentieth birthday. Concert engagements poured in, and she sang lieder in almost every university town as supporting artist to names such as Eugène Ysaÿe, Teresa Carreño and Max Reger. By 1905 she made her first appearances (with Nikisch) in Hamburg and Berlin (the Bechsteinhall), and in Berlin made the friendship of Richard Strauss. From summer 1905 she spent holidays with the Nikisch family near Ostend.

London, Europe, Russia, and USA before 1914 
Gerhardt first appeared at the Leipzig Opera as Mignon, in June 1905, and also performed Charlotte in Massenet's Werther there, under Nikisch, being coached by his student Albert Coates as Korrepetitor. Nikisch arranged and accompanied her 1906 London debut, first in a Mischa Elman concert, and then in a lieder recital (songs of Schubert, Schumann, Brahms, Wolf, etc.) at the Bechstein Hall. In April 1907 she first sang at the Royal Albert Hall, with an orchestra under Nikisch. Thereafter she returned to England annually until 1914 for autumn seasons, including regular tours of the provinces with Hamilton Harty or her loyal accompanist Paula Hegner.

The partnership with Nikisch was preserved in two series of records made in 1907 and 1911 in Berlin. A particular triumph was their appearance in the 1908 season of the Philharmonic Society in London. She sang by invitation to entertain royal guests to the Coronation of King George V and Queen Mary in 1911. Nikisch introduced her into the highest circles, including the Villa Wahnfried. She sang in many European capitals - Vienna, Budapest, Prague, Copenhagen, Christiania (Oslo) - and with old musical Societies at Cologne and Frankfurt, annually in Paris and London, and under Mengelberg at The Hague. Nikisch usually accompanied the first lieder concert at each centre, after which other accompanists took over. Alexander Siloti arranged her first visit to Russia (to Moscow) in 1909, and until the War she sang there and in St Petersburg.

Gerhardt made her American debut at the Carnegie Hall in January 1912, with Paula Hegner, and was then in Cincinnati and Philadelphia with Leopold Stokowski (singing the Wesendonck Lieder), and with the Boston Symphony Orchestra under Max Fiedler, before finally combining there with Nikisch and the London Symphony Orchestra tour. In London in 1912 she performed the Angel in Elgar's The Dream of Gerontius, a role more associated with her 'rival' and friend Julia Culp. Her second American tour was in early 1913, opening with the Boston Symphony under Karl Muck, and with Erich J. Wolff as accompanist, who died during the tour. They visited Boston, New York, Baltimore, Washington and Baton Rouge, Louisiana. Meta Schumann also served as her accompanist in America. Next season she sang in Paris, Moscow, Scandinavia, Hungary, Austria, the Netherlands, Italy, Scotland and England, culminating in London in July 1914 at the Queen's Hall under Richard Strauss - her last appearance there for eight years.

The First World War 
Returning from Ostend to Leipzig in August 1914, her English tours were impossible to fulfil, but she sang from Hamburg to Vienna and Budapest and returned triumphantly to America in 1915, and that winter sang in Denmark and Norway. In August 1916 she sang to German troops on the Western Front at Laon, through the efforts of her brother the singer Reinhold Gerhardt, a pupil of Karl Scheidemantel. Meanwhile in late 1916 she returned to the USA to give the East Coast tour with Karl Muck, and in April 1917 was singing in Los Angeles and San Francisco. As America entered the war she was shipped back to Germany with many other artists. She visited the Front again in summer 1918 with Wilhelm Backhaus (in uniform) as accompanist and concert partner. She continued to tour, from Norway to Hungary, through the chaos following the armistice, and was in Munich when Kurt Eisner was assassinated.

Between the wars 
In early 1920, she made a prolonged tour of Spain with Paula Hegner, and later that year to the USA again, where her collaboration with the model accompanist Coenraad V. Bos began. This partnership was renewed in the winter season of 1921-22 in New York. In March 1922 (soon after the death of Nikisch) she braved the return to London (Queen's Hall) with Paula Hegner, where her German art was received with an ovation. That was the start of an unbroken tie with England, which later became her home. The following years saw annual winter tours in USA (and the Pacific Coast from San Francisco to Vancouver in 1925), with extensive tours in UK, Europe and Germany. There were further Spanish tours, including one in winter 1928 with Bos. She was then singing Schubert's Winterreise which, as a female singer, she made particularly her own. At the start of 1929 she became head teacher of singing at the Leipzig Conservatory, and after October 1930 she discontinued her American tours, though still touring intensively in Britain and Europe. One of her students in Leipzig was Indian contralto Bina Addy.

In 1928, she met and fell in love with Dr Fritz Kohl, Director of Administration of the Mitteldeutscher Rundfunk in Leipzig, and they married in November 1932. In London she reappeared before the Royal Philharmonic Society in January 1931, under John Barbirolli, to perform Wolf songs with orchestral accompaniment, and Mahler's Kindertotenlieder. Her Hugo Wolf Song Society recordings were made in 1932. Following Hitler's rise to power, Kohl was arrested and imprisoned, not being released until June 1935, the only one of the German Broadcasting Directors to be acquitted by the Reichsgericht in Leipzig. With the help of Landon Ronald at the Guildhall School of Music, Elena meanwhile got a foothold in London in 1934, and after a last visit to Bayreuth to see Strauss conduct Parsifal ('It was no longer Richard Wagner's Bayreuth, but Hitler's'), London became the settled home of the couple. Over the following years, as the storm gathered, Elena gave recitals in the Netherlands, France and Britain, often with Gerald Moore accompanying, and developed a circle of singing pupils.

Wartime recitals in England 
With the outbreak of war, Gerhardt expected that her singing career was at an end as there should be no taste for German music in Britain, especially as she would only sing in German, and the broadcast of the German language was forbidden on the BBC home programmes. However, Myra Hess insisted upon involving her in the National Gallery mid-day concerts, where she first appeared in December 1939, and afterwards in twenty-two concerts with Myra Hess or Gerald Moore, being very greatly appreciated. With Myra Hess and Lionel Tertis she sang the Brahms viola songs and other lieder recitals in many parts of England and Scotland, including a complete Winterreise in Reading, and in 1942 gave BBC lieder broadcasts to Argentina. Her teaching picked up again after 1941. With Myra Hess she sang at Haslemere for Tobias Matthay and his pupils. She gave a sixtieth birthday concert in the Wigmore Hall in 1943, and further National Gallery and Wigmore Hall concerts in 1944. News of the destruction of Leipzig and Dresden filled her with deep sadness.

The diarist James Lees-Milne recorded a performance of Schubert by Gerhardt on Wednesday, March 18, 1942 at the National Gallery in London: "Elena Gerhardt came out close to where we were sitting. She is an enormous woman with so dropsical a belly that it looks like a pillow tied to her front not belonging to her person at all. She wore a black velvet dress like a monk's habit, tied with a black cord round her middle. She must be about sixty but still has a voice. When she walked in she was beautifully powdered, her grey hair tied up, immaculate. When she came out all the powder was gone, her face shining with sweat. She was mopping her forehead with a handkerchief. Yet she looked happy, fulfilled. Where we were sitting it was difficult to hear her clearly, and her low notes not at all."

Late career 
In 1946, when the BBC Third Programme (i.e., Radio 3, the classical music station) was inaugurated, she gave three broadcasts, including lieder recitals and talks about her career and the interpretation of Winterreise.  She also recorded Schumann's Frauenliebe und -leben in that year. She made a broadcast of Brahms's songs in May 1947. That was soon after her formal retirement from the platform in March 1947. Her husband Dr Kohl died in May 1947 and the remainder of her professional life was devoted to teaching in London, where one of her earliest pupils was Marina de Gabaráin. She managed to arrange the escape of her brother Reinhold and his family from Eastern Germany, and he joined the staff of the Guildhall School of Music.

Gerhardt was one of the very great interpreters of German lieder, a singer who made her career almost entirely in this genre. She published her autobiography in 1953.

She died on 11 January 1961 aged 77, in London.

Recordings 
(See discography by Desmond Shawe-Taylor, with titles and number listings. Dates may be of recording or of issue.)

Acoustic recordings:
1907 G&T recordings with Arthur Nikisch (Wolf, Bungert, Brahms, Strauss, Rubinstein) - six 10" and one 12" record/seven songs.
1911 Red Label German HMV recordings with Arthur Nikisch (Wolf, Brahms, Bungert, Strauss, Schumann, Schubert, Wagner) - ten 10" and seven 12" records/seventeen songs.
1913-1914 as above, with Bruno Seidler-Winkler (pno) - eleven 10" records/songs. (Strauss, Brahms, Schubert, Wolf).
1913-1914 as above, with orchestra cond. Seidler-Winkler - five 12" records/songs. (Strauss, Wagner, Gluck, Wolf).
1915 American Columbia, about 7 titles with orchestral accompaniment. (J. Strauss, Schulz, Grüber, and folk-songs)
1923 Aeolian Vocalion with Ivor Newton (pno) - six 12" records/songs. (Schubert, Grieg, Schumann, Strauss, Brahms)
1924 as above, with Harold Craxton (pno) - six 12" records/songs. (Schubert, Strauss and Brahms)
1924-1925 HMV red label, with ?Harold Craxton (pno) - seven titles (three 10" 2-sided records and one side unissued). (Schubert, Schumann, Wolf and Brahms)
Electric recordings:
1926 HMV red label, with Paula Hegner - eight songs, three 10" and two 12" records. (Brahms, Schubert)
1927 HMV red label, with Coenraad V. Bos - three songs, two 12" records. (Brahms, Reger)
1928 HMV Black Label Schubert Centenary Album - seven 12" and one 10" record (eight items from Winterreise, and ten other songs).
1929 HMV black label, with Harold Craxton - one 12" record, three songs (Brahms).
1929 HMV black label, with Coenraad V. Bos - two 12" records, six songs (Brahms).
1929 HMV red label, with Bos - one 10" record, three songs (Schubert and Wolf).
1929 HMV red label, with Bos - one 12" record, two songs (Schumann): another two sides of Schumann were recorded at this time (Wer machte dich so krank, and Alte Laute), but were not issued.
1932 HMV red label Hugo Wolf Society Volume I, with Coenraad V. Bos - six 12" records, nineteen songs.
1939 HMV White Label, privately published, with Gerald Moore - six 10" records, GR16-GR21. (Brahms, Complete Zigeunerlieder (eight songs), three other songs; Schubert (four), Wolf (two)).
1947-1948 HMV White Label, privately published, with Gerald Moore - (Schumann, Frauenliebe und -leben Complete, three 12" records). Also Schumann's Meine Rose was recorded, on one 12"" side, but was not issued.

Notes

Sources 
Arthur Eaglefield Hull, A Dictionary of Modern Music and Musicians (Dent, London 1924)
R. Elkin, Royal Philharmonic (Rider & co, London 1946)
E. Gerhardt, Recital (autobiography), (Methuen, London 1953).
G. Moore, Am I too loud? (Penguin, Harmondsworth 1966).
M. Scott, The Record of Singing Vol II (Duckworth, London 1979)
E. Williams, (Sleevenotes), Gerhardt & Nikisch recital, Delta LP TQD 3024 (Delta Records, London 1962).
H. Wood, My Life of Music (Gollancz, London 1938)

External links 

1883 births
1961 deaths
Musicians from Leipzig
German operatic mezzo-sopranos
Emigrants from Nazi Germany to the United Kingdom
20th-century German women opera singers
University of Music and Theatre Leipzig alumni